Socialist Alternative Future (SAB) is a Trotskyist political party in the Czech Republic, founded in 1990 by students active in the events of the Velvet Revolution. It affiliated to International Socialist Alternative in 1994.

Activism 
The party has participated in initiatives including fare boycott rides on public transport in protest at prices, and the No Bases ("Ne základnám") campaign against the establishment of a US military base in the Czech Republic, centred on a radar installation.

SAB also opposes racism against Romani people, and has attempted to raise support for socialist ideas among the Roma community. The party argues that capitalism must be removed in order to overcome the social and economic factors underpinning racism and the problematic coexistence of Romanis and the majority.

References

External links
Socialist Alternative Future

1990 establishments in Czechoslovakia
Anti-militarism in Europe
Anti-racist organizations in Europe
Communist parties in the Czech Republic
Far-left politics in the Czech Republic
Left-wing parties in the Czech Republic
Far-left political parties
Political parties established in 1990
Romani rights
Czech Republic
Trotskyist organizations in the Czech Republic
Velvet Revolution